Metastatic calcinosis cutis is a cutaneous condition characterized by calcification of the skin resulting from the deposition of calcium and phosphorus, and associated with an internal malignancy.

See also 
 Calcinosis cutis
 Skin lesion

References 

Skin conditions resulting from errors in metabolism